René Rivera, (July 20, 1935 – September 26, 2013), known professionally as Mario Montez, was one of the Warhol superstars, appearing in thirteen of Andy Warhol's underground films from 1964 to 1966. He took his name as a male homage to the actress Maria Montez, an important gay icon in the 1950s and 1960s. Before appearing in Warhol's films, he appeared in Jack Smith's underground films Flaming Creatures and Normal Love. Montez also stars in the Ron Rice film Chumlum, made in 1964. Mario Montez, was "a staple in the New York underground scene of the 1960s and '70s."

Early years
Montez was born René Rivera in Ponce, Puerto Rico, in 1935. When he was 8, the family moved to East Harlem where he grew up. In New York, he studied print and graphic arts but worked in clerical jobs.

Acting career
A cross dresser and drag queen, he took his name from the 1940s Hollywood starlet María Montez. His acting career started somewhat by chance when he met avant-garde filmmaker Jack Smith, who included him in his 1963 underground classic Flaming Creatures. Montez did not attend acting school, instead he admits he learned acting "from watching old movies".
 
Warhol gave Montez the "superstar" status he bestowed on his protégés, but in spite of working in many of his films, Montez never developed a close relationship with the famously laconic Warhol. Montez was also a co-founder of Charles Ludlam's Ridiculous Theatrical Company, which rehearsed at Montez's loft in SoHo.

Retirement from the film industry
In January 1977, Montez moved to Orlando, Florida. After moving to Florida, he quit entertainment altogether and remained out of the public eye until 2006 when he appeared in a documentary about filmmaker Jack Smith. In Florida, he returned to working clerical jobs.

Honors
In March 2010, Montez was honored by Columbia University's Center for the Study of Ethnicity and Race: "Mario is considered one of the most gifted performers of the underground period." In February 2012, Montez was honored with the Special Teddy Award 2012 at the Berlinale for his outstanding role in underground film history. "Mario was the first Superstar ever and the queen mom of all drag queens" John Waters in his laudation at the Teddy Award Ceremony 2012.

Death
He died of a stroke in 2013.

Filmography

Directed by Jack Smith
Flaming Creatures, 1962-63 (as Dolores Flores)
Normal Love, 1963–65
 The Borrowed Tambourine, 1967
Reefers of Technicolor Island/Jungle Island, 1967
No President, 1967-1970s

Directed by Ron Rice
Chumlum, 1963

Directed by Andy Warhol
Mario Banana No. 1, 1964
Mario Banana No. 2, 1964
Batman Dracula, 1964 (unfinished)
Mario Montez Dances, 1964
Harlot, 1964
Screen Test No. 2, 1965
Mario Montez [Screen Tests Portrait], 1965
Camp, 1965
More Milk, Yvette, 1965
Mario Montez and Boy, 1965 
Hedy, 1966
Ari and Mario, 1966
 Bufferin Commercial, 1966
The Chelsea Girls, 1966

Directed by Piero Heliczer
Dirt, 1965
Satisfaction

Directed by Bill Vehr
Avocada, 1965
Brothel, 1966
 Waiting for Sugar
The Mystery of the Spanish Lady
M. M. for M. M., 1967 (unfinished, lost)

Directed by José Rodriguez-Soltero
Life, Death and Assumption of Lupe Vélez, 1966

Directed by Frank Simon
The Queen, 1968 (cameo)

Directed by Avery Willard
Flaming Twenties, 1968
 The Gypsy's Ball, 1969

Directed by Takahiko Iimura 

 Face, 1969

Directed by Roberts Blossom
Movie, 196?

Directed by Alfredo Leonardi
Occhio privato sul nuovo mondo, 1970

Directed by Helio Oiticica
Agripina é Roma-Manhattan, 1972 (unfinished)

Directed by Leandro Katz
Reel Six, Charles Ludlam's Grand Tarot, 1987

Directed by Mary Jordan
Jack Smith and the Destruction of Atlantis, 2006

Directed by Conrad Ventur
 Mario Banana, 2010
 Mario Montez [Screen Test Portrait], 2010
 Atlantis, 2011
 Boca Chica, 2013

Directed by John Edward Heys
 A Lazy Summer Afternoon with Mario Montez, 2011

Plays 
 Conquest of the Universe or When Queens Collide, 1967
 Bluebeard, 1970
 Vain Victory, 1971

Awards 
2012: Special Teddy

References

External links

 "A Lazy Summer Afternoon with Mario Montez" at Berlinale 2012
The John Edward Heys Collection
 Katz, Leandro, Bedlam Days: The Early Plays of Charles Ludlam and The Ridiculous Theatrical Company, 

Puerto Rican LGBT entertainers
1935 births
2013 deaths
Puerto Rican male film actors
Male actors from Ponce, Puerto Rico
American drag queens
People associated with The Factory
People from East Harlem